Mount Iriga, also known as Mount Asog, is an active stratovolcano in the province of Camarines Sur, in the Philippines.

It is a stratovolcano about a kilometer from Lake Buhi. It has a large crater formed due to a debris avalanche.

Mount Iriga, generally known for its phreatic explosions, erupted in 1628 and 1642. After these eruptions, it remained dormant.

Gallery

See also
 List of potentially active volcanoes in the Philippines
 List of inactive volcanoes in the Philippines
 Philippine Institute of Volcanology and Seismology
 Iriga City

References

External links
 

Mountains of the Philippines
Stratovolcanoes of the Philippines
Subduction volcanoes
Volcanoes of Luzon
Active volcanoes of the Philippines
Landforms of Camarines Sur
Iriga